Virginie Paquet Ottaway (born 6 May 1967) is a French former professional tennis player.

Tennis career
A right-handed player, Paquet competed on the professional tour in the 1980s and early 1990s. She reached a career high singles ranking of 208 in the world and was ranked as high as 116 in doubles.

Paquet appeared in the main draws of both the Australian Open and French Open during her career. Her best grand slam performance came at the 1986 French Open, where she had a first round win over Maria Lindström, before falling in the second round to fifth seed and eventual semi-finalist Hana Mandlíková.

ITF finals

Doubles: 5 (4–1)

References

External links
 
 

1967 births
Living people
French female tennis players
20th-century French women